Vanilla siamensis (common name: Thai vanilla) is a plant species of southern China, Thailand, Cambodia, and Vietnam. It is an epiphyte that occurs in montane evergreen forests.

Description
Vanilla siamensis is an evergreen climber that forms dark green shoots several meters long and 0.4–2 centimeters in diameter. The leaves are oval, wedge-shaped at the base with a broad petiole 1.5–2.5 centimeters long. The leaf becomes elongated away from the base. The leaves grow to be 9–23 centimeters long and 4.5–10 centimeters wide.

Chromosomes
The chromosome number is 2n=32.

Distribution
Vanilla siamensis is found in Yunnan province of southern China, Thailand, Cambodia, and Vietnam. It grows in evergreen forests at altitudes ranging from 700 to 1300 meters.

Systematics
Vanilla siamensis was first described in 1925 by Dorothy G. Downie.

Within the genus Vanilla, Vanilla siamensis is placed in the subgenus Xanata in the section Tethya, which contains Old World species. Vanilla pierrei, described by François Gagnepain on the basis of only one bud, is considered a synonym by Soto Arenas and Cribb. They list Vanilla abundiflora and Vanilla kinabaluensis as related species.

References

siamensis
Orchids of China
Orchids of Thailand
Endangered flora of Asia